Modalen is a municipality in the Nordhordland district in the central part of Vestland county in Norway. The administrative centre of the municipality is the village of Mo. The other main village in the municipality is Øvre Helland. Most of the residents of Modalen live in the main Modalen valley which extends eastwards from the end of the Romarheimsfjorden.

The small population, combined with a large income from hydro-electric power production, has given the municipality the ability to give all its residents free wireless internet access in the municipality. They also were the first Norwegian municipality to buy a computer for all students in the municipality in 1993.

The  municipality is the 236th largest by area out of the 356 municipalities in Norway. Modalen is the 355th most populous municipality in Norway with a population of 378 (making it the second smallest municipality in Norway after Utsira).

General information

The parish of Modalen was separated from the old municipality of Hosanger on 1 January 1910 to become a separate municipality. Initially, the municipality had 821 residents. During the 1960s, there were many municipal mergers across Norway due to the work of the Schei Committee. On 1 January 1964, the middle part of the Eksingedalen valley (population: 151) was transferred from Modalen to the municipality of Vaksdal. Also on that date, the Nipo, Dyrkolbotn, and Eitrdalen farm areas (population: 12), located north of the village of Romarheim, were transferred from Modalen to the neighboring municipality of Lindås.

Name
The municipality (originally the parish) is named after the old Mo farm, since Mo Church was built there in the Middle Ages. The name is identical with the word mór which means "heath" or "moor". The last element -dalen (the finite form of dal which means "valley" or "dale") was added later.

Coat of arms
The coat of arms was granted on 2 November 1984. The arms are green with three silver spades. The spades are a symbol for the agriculture and sand digging in the municipality, which historically were of great importance.

Churches
The Church of Norway has one parish within the municipality of Modalen. It is part of the Nordhordland prosti (deanery) in the Diocese of Bjørgvin.

Government
All municipalities in Norway, including Modalen, are responsible for primary education (through 10th grade), outpatient health services, senior citizen services, unemployment and other social services, zoning, economic development, and municipal roads. The municipality is governed by a municipal council of elected representatives, which in turn elect a mayor.  The municipality falls under the Nordhordland District Court and the Gulating Court of Appeal.

Municipal council
The municipal council of Modalen is made up of 13 representatives that are elected every four years. Modalen is the only municipality in Norway that has a non-partisan council, so all representatives run on local lists rather than by party.

Mayor
The mayors of Modalen (incomplete list):
2019–present: Kjetil Eikefet (Bygdeliste)
2015-2019: Tom Kristian Thorsen (Bygdeliste)
2003-2015: Knut Moe (Bygdeliste)

Geography
Modalen municipality sits in the central part of Vestland county. It surrounds the innermost part of the Romarheimsfjorden (which is also called the Mofjorden) and the Modalen valley which extends eastwards from the end of the fjord. Both sides of the valley are mountainous, so the municipality is quite isolated with only two roads connecting it to the outside world. Both roads were constructed fairly recently, before that time, the municipality was only accessible by boat or crossing mountains on foot. The Modalen Tunnel was built in 1976 and it connects this valley to the Eksingedalen valley to the south. The other road was finished in 1996, and it follows the fjord heading west to Lindås.

The Modalen valley centers around the river Moelva. The lake Steinslandsvatnet, in the central part of the municipality, is the headwaters of the river. The high mountains that surround the valley provide many sources of hydroelectric power such as the lake Skjerjavatnet.

Modalen borders the municipality of Høyanger to the north and the municipality of Vik to the east, Vaksdal to the south, and Alver and Masfjorden to the west.

History

The Modalen project 
In 2001 Modalen got a 2-megabit broadband connection. The idea was to make Modalen the world's first fully-connected wireless broadband community. Modalen was the first community to undergo an all-broadband project as part of an effort by the Norwegian government to achieve full broadband coverage nationwide by 2004.

Notable people 
 Andres Lavik (1852–1941) a Norwegian farmer and politician, Mayor of Modalen in 1910
 Olav Nygard (1884 in Modalen – 1924) a Norwegian poet
 Johannes Moe (born 1926 in Modalen) a Norwegian engineer and research administrator

References

External links

Municipal fact sheet from Statistics Norway 

 
Municipalities of Vestland
1910 establishments in Norway